The 2022 Los Angeles Angels season was the 62nd season of the Los Angeles Angels franchise in the American League, the 57th in Anaheim, and their 57th season playing their home games at Angel Stadium. The Angels were managed by Joe Maddon in his third season as manager of the Angels. On June 7, 2022, Maddon was fired and Phil Nevin was named the interim manager for the remainder of the season after they had lost twelve games in a row, tying a record set by the 1988 team. Losses on the 7th and 8th resulted in a losing streak of fourteen in a row, setting a franchise record. After a brawl occurred during a game between the Seattle Mariners and Angels on June 26 that saw players and coaches receive suspensions, Bill Haselman and Ray Montgomery each served as interim managers to the interim manager when Nevin received a ten-game suspension. The Angels play as members of Major League Baseball's American League West division. On September 14, the Angels lost their 82nd game to clinch a losing season for the seventh straight season, tying the mark set by the 1971-1977 teams. With their loss to the Seattle Mariners on September 19, the Los Angeles Angels were officially eliminated from playoff contention.

On December 2, 2021, Commissioner of Baseball Rob Manfred announced a lockout of players, following expiration of the collective bargaining agreement (CBA) between the league and the Major League Baseball Players Association (MLBPA). On March 10, 2022, the MLB and MLBPA agreed to a new collective bargaining agreement, thus ending the lockout. Opening Day was played on April 7. Although MLB previously announced that several series would be cancelled due to the lockout, the agreement provides for a 162-game season, with originally canceled games to be made up via doubleheaders.

Joining PBP man Matt Vasgersian this season for broadcasts on Bally Sports West is Patrick O'Neal on his first season as alternative team PBP announcer. Because both the Mariners and the Philadelphia Phillies made the playoffs for the first time in 21 and 11 years, respectively, the Angels now co-hold MLB's longest active playoff drought with the Tigers. Both the Angels and the Tigers have not made the playoffs since 2014.

Offseason

Lockout 

The expiration of the league's collective bargaining agreement (CBA) with the Major League Baseball Players Association occurred on December 1, 2021, with no new agreement in place. As a result, the team owners voted unanimously to lockout the players stopping all free agency and trades.

The parties came to an agreement on a new CBA on March 10, 2022.

Rule changes 
Pursuant to the new CBA, several new rules were instituted for the 2022 season. The National League will adopt the designated hitter full-time, a draft lottery will be implemented, the postseason will expand from ten teams to twelve, and advertising patches will appear on player uniforms and helmets for the first time.

Opening Day lineup
The team opened the season with a 3–1 loss to the Houston Astros at Angel Stadium on April 7.

Regular season

April
The Angels opened the season on April 7 at home against the Houston Astros in front of a crowd of 44,723, losing 3–1 after Shohei Ohtani pitched 4.2 innings and gave up 1 run. The Angels won their first game of the season on April 9, a 2–0 win over Justin Verlander and the Astros with Noah Syndergaard earning the win in his team debut. The Angels had their first walk-off win on April 12 over the Miami Marlins with Tyler Wade scoring the winning run on a fielder's choice. During an April 20 game in Houston, the Angels scored six runs off Jake Odorizzi in the first inning and Ohtani carried a perfect game bid into the sixth inning. The win gave the Angels an early lead in the American League West standings. After losing their initial series to the Astros, the Angels won four out of their next five series in April, including a 4-game sweep of the Cleveland Guardians in Anaheim. The Angels finished the month of April with a 14–8 record.

May
The Angels entered May leading the AL West by 2.5 games. On May 1, newcomer Michael Lorenzen pitched the longest outing of his career at 8.1 innings and nearly achieved a shutout before runs were allowed in the 9th inning. On May 4, the Angels completed an extra-innings comeback after Jared Walsh tied the game in the top of the 9th inning and the Angels scored six runs in the 10th.

On May 10, Reid Detmers became the ninth player in Angels history to throw a no-hitter, doing so against the Tampa Bay Rays in a 12–0 win. At 22 years old, Detmers was the youngest MLB player to throw a no-hitter since Aníbal Sánchez in 2006. Detmers recorded only two strikeouts in the game and induced 10 groundouts. In the bottom of the 8th, Angels third baseman Anthony Rendon took the first left-handed at-bat of his career and proceeded to hit a two-run home run off Brett Phillips, a position player pitching, to make the score 12–0. The final out of the game was a groundout hit by Yandy Díaz to Andrew Velazquez that was caught by Jared Walsh at first base. After the game, the Angels moved to a 21–11 record with a 1-game lead in the AL West standings.

On May 13, Chase Silseth became the first member of 2021 MLB draft to make their major league debut. He pitched six innings, giving up only one hit and no runs in a win over the Oakland Athletics. On May 14, closer Raisel Iglesias gave up a walk-off home run to Athletics outfielder Luis Barrera, his first blown save since July 28, 2021. The Angels were swept for the first time that year during a series against the Texas Rangers in Arlington from May 16 to May 18. The team finished the month on a six-game losing streak after being swept by the Toronto Blue Jays in Anaheim and losing the first two games of a series against the New York Yankees in The Bronx.

June
On June 6, the Angels fell 1–0 to the Red Sox, bringing their losing streak to 12 games, tied for the worst in franchise history. The following day, Angels field manager Joe Maddon was fired by general manager Perry Minasian with approval from team owner Arte Moreno. Phil Nevin was named as the interim manager for the remainder of the 2022 season. On June 8, the Angels lost their 14th straight game, setting a new record for longest losing streak in franchise history. The streak was snapped the following day with a 5–2 win over the Red Sox and a seven-inning, one-run effort from Ohtani.

On June 11, Jared Walsh hit for the cycle in an 11–6 win over the New York Mets, becoming the ninth player in Angels history to do so. He hit a single in the third inning, double in the fifth, home run in the seventh, and triple in the eighth. He was the third MLB player to hit for the cycle in 2022, after Christian Yelich and Eduardo Escobar. He raised his season batting average from .248 to .260 with his 4-for-5 performance.

During a five-game series against the Seattle Mariners in Seattle from June 16 to June 19, Mike Trout hit five home runs, four of which were game-winning. Trout became the first player in league history to hit four game-winning home runs in a single series. Trout also tied Rafael Palmeiro for the most career home runs against the Mariners with 52 and added to his record of most home runs hit by a visiting player at T-Mobile Park with 33. On June 21, Shohei Ohtani went 3-for-4 with 2 home runs and a career-high 8 RBI, including a three-run home run to tie the game at 10 in the bottom of the ninth inning. Despite his efforts, the Angels lost the game to the Kansas City Royals by a score of 12–11 in extra innings. Ohtani pitched the following day, lasting 8 innings and only allowing 2 hits in a 5–0 victory over the Royals. On June 22, Reid Detmers was optioned to the Salt Lake Bees after posting a 5.67 ERA in six starts after his no-hitter.

On June 26, Mariners batter Julio Rodríguez was hit by a pitch from Angels opener Andrew Wantz in the first inning. In the second inning, Wantz also hit Jesse Winker. Shortly after the second HBP, Winker charged the Angels dugout, causing a bench-clearing brawl. Punches were thrown and three players from each team were ejected as well as both managers for a total of eight ejections. The following night, MLB announced suspensions for involvement in the brawl: Angels manager Phil Nevin received 10 games, Anthony Rendon received 5 games, Wantz received 3 games, Raisel Iglesias received two games, and several assistant coaches received brief suspensions. For the Mariners, Winker received a 7-game suspension, J. P. Crawford received 5 games, and Rodríguez received 2 games.

July
Reid Detmers was recalled from Salt Lake and made his first start back on July 8. During his minor league stint, pitching instructor Buddy Carlyle helped Detmers tweak an error with his mechanics during a videotape session. Following the change, Detmers posted a 1.13 ERA across 24 innings in his four July starts.

Mike Trout and Shohei Ohtani were selected to represent the Angels in the 2022 MLB All-Star Game, their 10th and second career selections respectively. Trout was elected as the starter in center field but did not play as he was placed on the 10-day injured list with left ribcage inflammation. Ohtani was selected as both a designated hitter and pitcher for the second consecutive season, and fans voted him as the starting DH over Yordan Álvarez. During the game, Ohtani went 1-for-1 with a walk.

On July 31, Detmers threw an immaculate inning in the second inning of a game against the Rangers, striking out Ezequiel Durán, Kole Calhoun, and Charlie Culberson on nine pitches. He followed Sandy Koufax and Mike Fiers as the third player in MLB history to throw a no-hitter and immaculate inning in the same season and became the first to do so as a rookie.

August
On August 2, MLB's mid-season trade deadline, the Angels traded outfielder Brandon Marsh to the Philadelphia Phillies in exchange for catching prospect Logan O'Hoppe. Shortly after, the Angels completed another trade with the Phillies, sending veteran starting pitcher Noah Syndergaard in exchange for former top draft pick Mickey Moniak and prospect Jadiel Sanchez. A last-second deal sent Angels closer Raisel Iglesias to the Atlanta Braves in exchange for Jesse Chavez and Tucker Davidson, a move considered by the media to be a salary dump as Iglesias was only on the first year of the four-year, $58 million contract he had signed with the team in the previous offseason.

On August 23, Angels owner Arte Moreno formally announced that he would explore a possible sale of the franchise with preliminary media reports saying the hypothetical change in ownership was likely. In a statement, Moreno said that he decided to explore a sale after a "great deal of thoughtful consideration". At the time of the announcement, the Federal Bureau of Investigation was conducting a corruption probe for the quashed stadium property sale that prompted Anaheim mayor Harry Sidhu's resignation.

American League West

American League Wild Card

Record against opponents

Angels team leaders

 Minimum 3.1 plate appearances per team games played
 Minimum 1 inning pitched per team games played

Game Log
The Angels were originally scheduled to open their season away at the Oakland Athletics on March 31. Due to the 2021–22 Major League Baseball lockout, the first two series of the year were postponed and are to be played at later dates in the season. The Angels opened at home on April 7, losing 3–1 to the Houston Astros.

|- style="background:#fbb;" 
| 1 || April 7 || Astros || 1–3 || Valdez (1–0) || Ohtani (0–1) || Pressly (1) || Angel Stadium || 44,723 || 0–1 || L1
|- style="background:#fbb;" 
| 2 || April 8 || Astros || 6–13 || Montero (1–0) || Ortega (0–1) || — || Angel Stadium || 42,719 || 0–2 || L2
|- style="background:#bfb;" 
| 3 || April 9 || Astros || 2–0 || Syndergaard (1–0) || Verlander (0–1) || Iglesias (1) || Angel Stadium || 36,139 || 1–2 || W1
|- style="background:#fbb;" 
| 4 || April 10 || Astros || 1–4 || Urquidy (1–0) || Suárez (0–1) || Pressly (2) || Angel Stadium || 41,253 || 1–3 || L1
|- style="background:#bfb;" 
| 5 || April 11 || Marlins || 6–2 || Lorenzen (1–0) || Hernández (0–1) || — || Angel Stadium || 20,480 || 2–3 || W1
|- style="background:#bfb;" 
| 6 || April 12 || Marlins || 4–3 || Iglesias (1–0) || Bender (0–1) || — || Angel Stadium || 16,132 || 3–3 || W2
|- style="background:#fbb;" 
| 7 || April 14 || @ Rangers || 5–10 || King (1–0) || Ohtani (0–2) || — || Globe Life Field || 21,440 || 3–4 || L1
|- style="background:#bfb;" 
| 8 || April 15 || @ Rangers || 9–6 || Warren (1–0) || Allard (0–1) || Iglesias (2) || Globe Life Field || 28,723 || 4–4 || W1
|- style="background:#bfb;" 
| 9 || April 16 || @ Rangers || 7–2 || Syndergaard (2–0) || Hearn (0–1) || — || Globe Life Field || 34,493 || 5–4 || W2
|- style="background:#bfb;" 
| 10 || April 17 || @ Rangers || 8–3 || Mayers (1–0) || Pérez (0–2) || — || Globe Life Field || 22,650 || 6–4 || W3
|- style="background:#fbb;" 
| 11 || April 18 || @ Astros || 3–8 || García (1–0) || Lorenzen (1–1) || — || Minute Maid Park || 42,646 || 6–5 || L1
|- style="background:#bfb;" 
| 12 || April 19 || @ Astros || 7–2 || Ortega (1–1) || Valdez (1–1) || — || Minute Maid Park || 30,212 || 7–5 || W1
|- style="background:#bfb;" 
| 13 || April 20 || @ Astros || 6–0 || Ohtani (1–2) || Odorizzi (0–2) || — || Minute Maid Park || 29,049 || 8–5 || W2
|- style="background:#fbb;" 
| 14 || April 22 || Orioles || 3–5 || Zimmermann (1–0) || Detmers (0–1) || López (3) || Angel Stadium || 31,679 || 8–6 || L1
|- style="background:#fbb;" 
| 15 || April 23 || Orioles || 4–5 || Baker (1–0) || Loup (0–1) || López (4) || Angel Stadium || 43,883 || 8–7 || L2
|- style="background:#bfb;" 
| 16 || April 24 || Orioles || 7–6 || Herget (1–0) || Baumann (1–2) || Bradley (1) || Angel Stadium || 41,984 || 9–7 || W1
|- style="background:#bfb;" 
| 17 || April 25 || Guardians || 3–0 || Lorenzen (2–1) || Bieber (1–1) || Iglesias (3) || Angel Stadium || 23,099 || 10–7 || W2
|- style="background:#bfb;" 
| 18 || April 26 || Guardians || 4–1 || Sandoval (1–0) || McKenzie (0–2) || Iglesias (4) || Angel Stadium || 22,551 || 11–7 || W3
|- style="background:#bfb;" 
| 19 || April 27 || Guardians || 9–5 || Ohtani (2–2) || Plesac (1–2) || — || Angel Stadium || 28,557 || 12–7 || W4
|- style="background:#bfb;" 
| 20 || April 28 || Guardians || 4–1 || Detmers (1–1) || Quantrill (1–1) || Iglesias (5) || Angel Stadium || 18,826 || 13–7 || W5
|- style="background:#bfb;" 
| 21 || April 29 || @ White Sox || 5–1 || Warren (2–0) || Giolito (0–1) || Iglesias (6) || Guaranteed Rate Field || 23,709 || 14–7 || W6
|- style="background:#fbb;" 
| 22 || April 30 || @ White Sox || 0–4 || Velasquez (1–2) || Suárez (0–2) || — || Guaranteed Rate Field || 33,762 || 14–8 || L1
|- 

|- style="background:#bfb;" 
| 23 || May 1 || @ White Sox || 6–5 || Lorenzen (3–1) || Keuchel (1–3) || Tepera (1) || Guaranteed Rate Field || 27,664 || 15–8 || W1
|- style="background:#fbb;" 
| 24 || May 2 || @ White Sox || 0–3 || Cease (3–1) || Sandoval (1–1) || Hendriks (5) || Guaranteed Rate Field || 13,112 || 15–9 || L1
|- style="background:#fbb;"
| 25 || May 3 || @ Red Sox || 0–4 || Wacha (3–0) || Syndergaard (2–1) || — || Fenway Park || 29,793 || 15–10 || L2
|- style="background:#bfb;" 
| 26 || May 4 || @ Red Sox || 10–5  || Tepera (1–0) || Barnes (0–2) || — || Fenway Park || 27,679 || 16–10 || W1
|- style="background:#bfb;" 
| 27 || May 5 || @ Red Sox || 8–0 || Ohtani (3–2) || Houck (2–2) || — || Fenway Park || 29,476 || 17–10 || W2
|- style="background:#bfb;" 
| 28 || May 6 || Nationals || 3–0 || Díaz (1–0) || Adon (1–5) || Iglesias (7) || Angel Stadium || 41,923 || 18–10 || W3
|- style="background:#fbb;" 
| 29 || May 7 || Nationals || 3–7 || Gray (4–2) || Lorenzen (3–2) || — || Angel Stadium || 30,666 || 18–11 || L1
|- style="background:#bfb;" 
| 30 || May 8 || Nationals || 5–4 || Barría (1–0) || Rainey (0–1) || — || Angel Stadium || 32,337 || 19–11 || W1
|- style="background:#bfb;"
| 31 || May 9 || Rays || 11–3 || Syndergaard (3–1) || Springs (1–1) || — || Angel Stadium || 19,537 || 20–11 || W2
|- style="background:#bfb;" 
| 32 || May 10 || Rays || 12–0 || Detmers (2–1) || Kluber (1–2) || — || Angel Stadium || 39,313 || 21–11 || W3
|- style="background:#fbb;" 
| 33 || May 11 || Rays || 2–4  || Feyereisen (3–0) || Loup (0–2) || Raley (3) || Angel Stadium || 21,045 || 21–12 || L1
|- style="background:#bfb;" 
| 34 || May 13 || @ Athletics || 2–0 || Silseth (1–0) || Jefferies (1–6) || Iglesias (8) || Oakland Coliseum || 13,992 || 22–12 || W1
|- style="background:#fbb;" 
| 35 || May 14  || @ Athletics || 3–4 || Trivino (1–2) || Iglesias (1–1) || — || Oakland Coliseum || 12,719 || 22–13 || L1
|- style="background:#bfb;" 
| 36 || May 14  || @ Athletics || 9–1 || Lorenzen (4–2) || Oller (0–3) || — || Oakland Coliseum || 7,737 || 23–13 || W1
|- style="background:#bfb;" 
| 37 || May 15 || @ Athletics || 4–1 || Sandoval (2–1) || Montas (2–4) || Herget (1) || Oakland Coliseum || 14,668 || 24–13 || W2
|- style="background:#fbb;" 
| 38 || May 16 || @ Rangers || 4–7 || Gray (1–1) || Syndergaard (3–2) || Barlow (7) || Globe Life Field || 15,110 || 24–14 || L1
|- style="background:#fbb;" 
| 39 || May 17 || @ Rangers || 5–10 || Santana (1–1) || Tepera (1–1) || — || Globe Life Field || 17,727 || 24–15 || L2
|- style="background:#fbb;" 
| 40 || May 18 || @ Rangers || 5–6  || Santana (2–1) || Iglesias (1–2) || — || Globe Life Field || 20,366 || 24–16 || L3
|- style="background:#fbb;" 
| 41 || May 20 || Athletics || 2–4 || Moll (1–0) || Silseth (1–1) || Jiménez (8) || Angel Stadium || 32,422 || 24–17 || L4
|- style="background:#bfb;" 
| 42 || May 21 || Athletics || 5–3 || Lorenzen (5–2) || Kolarek (0–1) || Iglesias (9) || Angel Stadium || 39,045 || 25–17 || W1
|- style="background:#bfb;" 
| 43 || May 22 || Athletics || 4–1 || Sandoval (3–1) || Irvin (2–2) || Iglesias (10) || Angel Stadium || 40,042 || 26–17 || W2
|- style="background:#bfb;"
| 44 || May 24 || Rangers || 5–3 || Syndergaard (4–2) || Dunning (1–3) || Iglesias (11) || Angel Stadium || 23,791 || 27–17 || W3
|- style="background:#fbb;"
| 45 || May 25 || Rangers || 2–7 || Otto (2–2) || Detmers (2–2) || — || Angel Stadium || 22,950 || 27–18 || L1
|- style="background:#fbb;" 
| 46 || May 26 || Blue Jays || 3–6 || Ryu (2–0) || Ohtani (3–3) || — || Angel Stadium || 28,288 || 27–19 || L2
|- style="background:#fbb;" 
| 47 || May 27 || Blue Jays || 3–4 || Richards (2–0) || Iglesias (1–3) || Romano (15) || Angel Stadium || 44,641 || 27–20 || L3
|- style="background:#fbb;" 
| 48 || May 28 || Blue Jays || 5–6 || Cimber (5–2) || Barraclough (0–1) || Stripling (1) || Angel Stadium || 34,005 || 27–21 || L4
|- style="background:#fbb;" 
| 49 || May 29 || Blue Jays || 10–11 || Cimber (6–2) || Quijada (0–1) || Phelps (1) || Angel Stadium || 36,568 || 27–22 || L5
|- style="background:#fbb;" 
| 50 || May 31 || @ Yankees || 1–9 || Montgomery (1–1) || Syndergaard (4–3) || — || Yankee Stadium || 31,242 || 27–23 || L6
|- 

|- style="background:#bbb;" 
| — || June 1 || @ Yankees || colspan=8| Postponed (rain); Makeup date: June 2
|- style="background:#fbb;" 
| 51 || June 2  || @ Yankees || 1–6 || Cortés Jr. (5–1) || Ohtani (3–4) || Peralta (1) || Yankee Stadium || 30,518 || 27–24 || L7
|- style="background:#fbb;" 
| 52 || June 2  || @ Yankees || 1–2 || Taillon (6–1) || Ortega (1–2) || Holmes (7) || Yankee Stadium || 33,476 || 27–25 || L8
|- style="background:#fbb;" 
| 53 || June 3 || @ Phillies || 0–10 || Eflin (2–4) || Silseth (1–2) || — || Citizens Bank Park || 28,721 || 27–26 || L9
|- style="background:#fbb;"
| 54 || June 4 || @ Phillies || 2–7 || Wheeler (4–3) || Lorenzen (5–3) || — || Citizens Bank Park || 36,313 || 27–27 || L10
|- style="background:#fbb;" 
| 55 || June 5 || @ Phillies || 7–9 || Knebel (2–4) || Iglesias (1–4) || — || Citizens Bank Park || 34,801 || 27–28 || L11
|- style="background:#fbb;"
| 56 || June 6 || Red Sox || 0–1 || Wacha (4–1) || Syndergaard (4–4) || — || Angel Stadium || 29,395 || 27–29 || L12
|- style="background:#fbb;"
| 57 || June 7 || Red Sox || 5–6  || Houck (4–3) || Barría (1–1) || Strahm (2) || Angel Stadium || 27,627 || 27–30 || L13
|- style="background:#fbb;"
| 58 || June 8 || Red Sox || 0–1 || Eovaldi (4–2) || Herget (1–1) || Strahm (3) || Angel Stadium || 26,587 || 27–31 || L14
|- style="background:#bfb;" 
| 59 || June 9 || Red Sox || 5–2 || Ohtani (4–4) || Pivetta (5–5) || Iglesias (12) || Angel Stadium || 28,595 || 28–31 || W1
|- style="background:#fbb;" 
| 60 || June 10 || Mets || 3–7 || Peterson (3–0) || Díaz (1–1) || — || Angel Stadium || 31,499 || 28–32 || L1
|- style="background:#bfb;"
| 61 || June 11 || Mets || 11–6 || Lorenzen (6–3) || Carrasco (7–2) || — || Angel Stadium || 36,408 || 29–32 || W1
|- style="background:#fbb;" 
| 62 || June 12 || Mets || 1–4 || Walker (4–2) || Sandoval (3–2) || Díaz (12) || Angel Stadium || 36,598 || 29–33 || L1
|- style="background:#fbb;"
| 63 || June 14 || @ Dodgers || 0–2 || Gonsolin (8–0) || Syndergaard (4–5) || Kimbrel (12) || Dodger Stadium || 51,013 || 29–34 || L2
|- style="background:#fbb;"
| 64 || June 15 || @ Dodgers || 1–4 || Anderson (8–0) || Detmers (2–3) || — || Dodger Stadium || 50,812 || 29–35 || L3
|- style="background:#bfb;" 
| 65 || June 16 || @ Mariners || 4–1 || Ohtani (5–4) || Kirby (1–2) || Iglesias (13) || T-Mobile Park || 21,485 || 30–35 || W1
|- style="background:#fbb;" 
| 66 || June 17 || @ Mariners || 1–8 || Ray (6–6) || Lorenzen (6–4) || — || T-Mobile Park || 37,500 || 30–36 || L1
|- style="background:#bfb;" 
| 67 || June 18  || @ Mariners || 4–2  || Iglesias (2–4) || Castillo (3–1) || Quijada (1) || T-Mobile Park || 24,071 || 31–36 || W1
|- style="background:#bfb;" 
| 68 || June 18  || @ Mariners || 3–0 || Herget (2–1) || Milone (0–1) || Bradley (2) || T-Mobile Park || 20,804 || 32–36 || W2
|- style="background:#bfb;" 
| 69 || June 19 || @ Mariners || 4–0 || Wantz (1–0) || Gilbert (7–3) || — || T-Mobile Park || 39,052 || 33–36 || W3
|- style="background:#fbb;" 
| 70 || June 20 || Royals || 2–6 || Bubic (1–4) || Syndergaard (4–6) || — || Angel Stadium || 22,234 || 33–37 || L1
|- style="background:#fbb;" 
| 71 || June 21 || Royals || 11–12  || Coleman (2–1) || Quijada (0–2) || Mengden (1) || Angel Stadium || 20,189 || 33–38 || L2
|- style="background:#bfb;" 
| 72 || June 22 || Royals || 5–0 || Ohtani (6–4) || Lynch (3–7) || — || Angel Stadium || 34,792 || 34–38 || W1
|- style="background:#fbb;" 
| 73 || June 24 || Mariners || 3–4 || Flexen (3–8) || Lorenzen (6–5) || Sewald (6) || Angel Stadium || 35,704 || 34–39 || L1
|- style="background:#fbb;"
| 74 || June 25 || Mariners || 3–5 || Gilbert (8–3) || Bradley (0–1) || Swanson (1) || Angel Stadium || 35,466 || 34–40 || L2
|- style="background:#bfb;" 
| 75 || June 26 || Mariners || 2–1 || Suárez (1–2) || Gonzales (4–8) || Ortega (1) || Angel Stadium || 26,489 || 35–40 || W1
|- style="background:#bfb;" 
| 76 || June 27 || White Sox || 4–3 || Syndergaard (5–6) || López (4–2) || Iglesias (14) || Angel Stadium || 21,973 || 36–40 || W2
|- style="background:#fbb;" 
| 77 || June 28 || White Sox || 4–11 || Cueto (2–4) || Ortega (1–3) || — || Angel Stadium || 23,979 || 36–41 || L1
|- style="background:#bfb;"
| 78 || June 29 || White Sox || 4–1 || Ohtani (7–4) || Kopech (2–5) || Iglesias (15) || Angel Stadium || 27,612 || 37–41 || W1
|- 

|- style="background:#fbb;" 
| 79 || July 1 || @ Astros || 1–8 || Javier (6–3) || Lorenzen (6–6) || — || Minute Maid Park || 36,420 || 37–42 || L1
|- style="background:#fbb;" 
| 80 || July 2 || @ Astros || 1–9 || Urquidy (7–3) || Sandoval (3–3) || — || Minute Maid Park || 35,332 || 37–43 || L2
|- style="background:#fbb;" 
| 81 || July 3 || @ Astros || 2–4 || Pressly (2–2) || Tepera (1–2) || — || Minute Maid Park || 36,048 || 37–44 || L3
|- style="background:#fbb;" 
| 82 || July 5 || @ Marlins || 1–2 || Alcántara (9–3) || Syndergaard (5–7) || Scott (10) || LoanDepot Park || 13,338 || 37–45 || L4
|- style="background:#bfb;" 
| 83 || July 6 || @ Marlins || 5–2 || Ohtani (8–4) || Rogers (4–7) || — || LoanDepot Park || 18,741 || 38–45 || W1
|- style="background:#fbb;" 
| 84 || July 7 || @ Orioles || 1–4 || Lyles (5–7) || Silseth (1–3) || López (15) || Camden Yards || 13,088 || 38–46 || L1
|- style="background:#fbb;" 
| 85 || July 8 || @ Orioles || 4–5 || Tate (1–3) || Iglesias (2–5) || — || Camden Yards || 27,814 || 38–47 || L2
|- style="background:#fbb;" 
| 86 || July 9 || @ Orioles || 0–1 || Kremer (3–1) || Sandoval (3–4) || López (16) || Camden Yards || 32,286 || 38–48 || L3
|- style="background:#fbb;"
| 87 || July 10 || @ Orioles || 5–9 || Voth (1–1) || Suárez (1–3) || — || Camden Yards || 19,521 || 38–49 || L4
|- style="background:#fbb;"
| 88 || July 12 || Astros || 5–6 || Neris (2–3) || Iglesias (2–6) || Pressly (19) || Angel Stadium || 27,180 || 38–50 || L5
|- style="background:#bfb;"
| 89 || July 13 || Astros || 7–1 || Ohtani (9–4) || Javier (6–5) || — || Angel Stadium || 27,803 || 39–50 || W1
|- style="background:#fbb;"
| 90 || July 14 || Astros || 2–3  || Pressly (3–2) || Loup (0–3) || — || Angel Stadium || 34,496 || 39–51 || L1
|- style="background:#fbb;"
| 91 || July 15 || Dodgers || 1–9 || Kershaw (7–2) || Sandoval (3–5) || — || Angel Stadium || 44,648 || 39–52 || L2
|- style="background:#fbb;"
| 92 || July 16 || Dodgers || 1–7 || Urías (8–6) || Suárez (1–4) || — || Angel Stadium || 44,728 || 39–53 || L3
|- style="background:#bcf
| ASG || July 19 || AL @ NL || 3–2 || Valdez (1–0) || Gonsolin (0–1) || Clase (1) || Dodger Stadium || 52,518 || N/A || N/A
|- style="background:#fbb;"
| 93 || July 22 || @ Braves || 1–8 || Lee (2–0) || Ohtani (9–5) || — || Truist Park || 42,867 || 39–54 || L4
|- style="background:#fbb;"
| 94 || July 23 || @ Braves || 2–7 || Wright (12–4) || Sandoval (3–6) || — || Truist Park || 42,827 || 39–55 || L5
|- style="background:#bfb;"
| 95 || July 24 || @ Braves || 9–1 || Detmers (3–3) || Anderson (8–6) || — || Truist Park || 42,663 || 40–55 || W1
|- style="background:#fbb;"
| 96 || July 25 || @ Royals || 0–7 || Garrett (2–1) || Syndergaard (5–8) || — || Kauffman Stadium || 16,616 || 40–56 || L1
|- style="background:#bfb;"
| 97 || July 26 || @ Royals || 6–0 || Suárez (2–4) || Zerpa (2–1) || — || Kauffman Stadium || 20,834 || 41–56 || W1
|- style="background:#bfb;" 
| 98 || July 27 || @ Royals || 4–0 || Junk (1–0) || Keller (5–11) || — || Kauffman Stadium || 12,596 || 42–56 || W2
|- style="background:#fbb;" 
| 99 || July 28 || Rangers || 0–2 || Howard (2–2) || Ohtani (9–6) || Moore (2) || Angel Stadium || 29,718 || 42–57 || L1
|- style="background:#fbb;"
| 100 || July 29 || Rangers || 2–7 || Pérez (9–2) || Sandoval (3–7) || — || Angel Stadium || 29,906 || 42–58 || L2
|- style="background:#bfb;"
| 101 || July 30 || Rangers || 9–7 || Toussaint (1–0) || Martin (0–7) || Iglesias (16) || Angel Stadium || 32,968 || 43–58 ||W1
|- style="background:#fbb;"
| 102 || July 31 || Rangers || 2–5 || Burke (5–2) || Quijada (0–3) || Hernández (1) || Angel Stadium || 29,257 || 43–59 || L1
|- 

|- style="background:#bfb;"
| 103 || August 2 || Athletics || 3-1 || Suárez (3–4) || Irvin (6–8) || Quijada (2) || Angel Stadium || 22,920 || 44–59 ||W1
|- style="background:#fbb;" 
| 104 || August 3 || Athletics || 1–3 || Kaprielian (3–5) || Ohtani (9–7) || Jackson (3) || Angel Stadium || 25,190 || 44–60 || L1
|- style="background:#fbb;"
| 105 || August 4 || Athletics || 7–8 || Blackburn (7–6) || Junk (1–1) || Puk (3) || Angel Stadium || 23,849 || 44–61 || L2
|- style="background:#bfb;"
| 106 || August 5 || @ Mariners || 4–3  || Chavez (2–1) || Sewald (3–3) || Herget (2) || T-Mobile Park || 42,654 || 45–61 || W1
|- style="background:#fbb;"
| 107 || August 6  || @ Mariners || 1–2 || Kirby (3–3) || Barría (1–2) || Swanson (3) || T-Mobile Park || 41,507 || 45–62 || L1
|- style="background:#bfb;"
| 108 || August 6  || @ Mariners || 7–1 || Detmers (4–3) || Flexen (7–9) || — || T-Mobile Park || 27,065 || 46–62 || W1
|- style="background:#fbb;"
| 109 || August 7 || @ Mariners || 3–6 || Gonzales (7–11)  || Davidson (1–3)  || Sewald (14) || T-Mobile Park || 34,837 || 46–63 || L1
|- style="background:#bfb;"
| 110 || August 8 || @ Athletics || 1–0 || Suárez (4–4) || Irvin (6–9) || Tepera (2) || Oakland Coliseum || 5,440 || 47–63 || W1
|- style="background:#bfb;" 
| 111 || August 9 || @ Athletics || 5–1 || Ohtani (10–7) || Kaprielian (3–6) || — || Oakland Coliseum || 9,351 || 48–63 || W2
|- style="background:#bfb;"
| 112 || August 10 || @ Athletics || 5–4  || Barría (2–2) || Pruitt (0–1) || — || Oakland Coliseum || 8,268 || 49–63 || W3
|- style="background:#fbb;"
| 113 || August 12 || Twins || 0–4 || Mahle (6–7) || Sandoval (3–8) || — || Angel Stadium || 33,459 || 49–64 || L1
|- style="background:#bfb;"
| 114 || August 13 || Twins || 5–3  || Tepera (2–2) || Pagán (3–6) || — || Angel Stadium || 43,027 || 50–64 || W1
|- style="background:#bfb;"
| 115 || August 14 || Twins || 4–2 || Davidson (2–3) || Archer (2–6) || Quijada (3) || Angel Stadium || 27,515 || 51–64 || W2
|- style="background:#fbb;"
| 116 || August 15 || Mariners || 2–6 || Muñoz (2–4) || Loup (0–4) || — || Angel Stadium || 23,096 || 51–65 || L1
|- style="background:#fbb;"
| 117 || August 16 || Mariners || 2–8 || Ray (9–8) || Suárez (4–5) || — || Angel Stadium || 20,294 || 51–66 || L2
|- style="background:#fbb;"
| 118 || August 17 || Mariners || 7–11 || Kirby (5–3) || Toussaint (1–1) || — || Angel Stadium || 19,550 || 51–67 || L3
|- style="background:#bfb;"
| 119 || August 19 || @ Tigers || 1–0 || Sandoval (4–8) || Manning (0–1) || — || Comerica Park || 28,197 || 52–67 || W1
|- style="background:#fbb;" 
| 120 || August 20 || @ Tigers || 3–4 || Alexander (3–7) || Detmers (4–4) || Soto (23) || Comerica Park || 23,581 || 52–68 || L1
|- style="background:#fbb;"
| 121 || August 21 || @ Tigers || 0–4 || Rodríguez (2–3) || Ohtani (10–8) || — || Comerica Park || 23,064 || 52–69 || L2
|- style="background:#fbb;"
| 122 || August 22 || @ Rays || 1–2 || Springs (6–3) || Davidson (2–4) || Armstrong (1) || Tropicana Field || 9,942 || 52–70 || L3
|- style="background:#fbb;"
| 123 || August 23 || @ Rays || 1–11 || Kluber (8–7) || Suárez (4–6) || — || Tropicana Field || 8,810 || 52–71 || L4
|- style="background:#fbb;"
| 124 || August 24 || @ Rays || 3–4  || Chargois (1–0) || Barría (2–3) || — || Tropicana Field || 9,763 || 52–72 || L5
|- style="background:#fbb;"
| 125 || August 25 || @ Rays || 3–8 || Rasmussen (9–4) || Sandoval (4–9) || — || Tropicana Field || 10,733 || 52–73 || L6
|- style="background:#bfb;"
| 126 || August 26 || @ Blue Jays || 12–0 || Detmers (5–4) || White (1–4) || — || Rogers Centre || 40,754 || 53–73 || W1
|- style="background:#bfb;"
| 127 || August 27 || @ Blue Jays || 2–0 || Ohtani (11–8) || Manoah (12–7) || Herget (3) || Rogers Centre || 45,311 || 54–73 || W2
|- style="background:#bfb;"
| 128 || August 28 || @ Blue Jays || 8–3 || Wantz (2–0) || Stripling (6–4) || — || Rogers Centre || 44,318 || 55–73 || W3
|- style="background:#bfb;"
| 129 || August 29 || Yankees || 4–3 || Suárez (5–6) || Montas (4–11) || Herget (4) || Angel Stadium || 44,537 || 56–73 || W4
|- style="background:#fbb;" 
| 130 || August 30 || Yankees || 4–7 || Weissert (1–0) || Mayers (1–1) || — || Angel Stadium || 42,684 || 56–74 || L1
|- style="background:#bfb;"
| 131 || August 31 || Yankees || 3–2 || Sandoval (5–9) || Cole (10–7) || Herget (5) || Angel Stadium || 43,555 || 57–74 || W1
|- 

|- style="background:#fbb;"
| 132 || September 2 || Astros || 2–4 || McCullers Jr. (2–1) || Detmers (5–5) || Montero (11) || Angel Stadium || 22,464 || 57–75 || L1
|- style="background:#bfb;" 
| 133 || September 3 || Astros || 2–1  || Tepera (3–2) || Martinez (0–2) || — || Angel Stadium || 38,244 || 58–75 || W1
|- style="background:#fbb;" 
| 134 || September 4 || Astros || 1–9 || Urquidy (13–5) || Davidson (2–5) || — || Angel Stadium || 28,179 || 58–76 || L1
|- style="background:#bfb;" 
| 135 || September 5 || Tigers || 10–0 || Suárez (6–6) || Alexander (3–9) || — || Angel Stadium || 19,518 || 59–76 || W1
|- style="background:#bfb;"
| 136 || September 6 || Tigers || 5–4  || Tepera (4–2) || Chafin (1–3) || — || Angel Stadium || 20,002 || 60–76 || W2
|- style="background:#fbb;"
| 137 || September 7 || Tigers || 4–5 || Cisnero (1–0) || Quijada (0–4) || Soto (25) || Angel Stadium || 15,756 || 60–77 || L1
|- style="background:#fbb;"
| 138 || September 9 || @ Astros || 3–4 || McCullers Jr. (3–1) || Wantz (2–1) || Pressly (26) || Minute Maid Park || 33,509 || 60–78 || L2
|- style="background:#bfb;"
| 139 || September 10 || @ Astros || 6–1 || Ohtani (12–8) || Urquidy (13–6) || — || Minute Maid Park || 38,533 || 61–78 || W1
|- style="background:#fbb;" 
| 140 || September 11 || @ Astros || 4–12 || García (12–8) || Davidson (2–6) || — || Minute Maid Park || 32,901 || 61–79 || L1
|- style="background:#fbb;" 
| 141 || September 12 || @ Guardians || 4–5 || De Los Santos (4–0) || Loup (0–5) || Clase (34) || Progressive Field || 12,461 || 61–80 || L2
|- style="background:#fbb;" 
| 142 || September 13 || @ Guardians || 1–3 || McCarty (3–2) || Suárez (6–7) || Clase (35) || Progressive Field || 14,419 || 61–81 || L3
|- style="background:#fbb;" 
| 143 || September 14 || @ Guardians || 3–5 || Stephan (5–4) || Tepera (4–3) || Karinchak (3) || Progressive Field || 14,529 || 61–82 || L4
|- style="background:#bfb;"
| 144 || September 16 || Mariners || 8–7 || Lorenzen (7–6) || Ray (12–10) || Tepera (3) || Angel Stadium || 37,480 || 62–82 || W1
|- style="background:#bfb;" 
| 145 || September 17 || Mariners || 2–1 || Ohtani (13–8) || Kirby (7–4) || Loup (1) || Angel Stadium || 35,538 || 63–82 || W2
|- style="background:#bfb;" 
| 146 || September 18 || Mariners || 5–1 || Detmers (6–5) || Gonzales (10–14) || — || Angel Stadium || 24,929 || 64–82 || W3
|- style="background:#fbb;"
| 147 || September 19 || Mariners || 1–9 || Gilbert (13–5) || Suárez (6–8) || — || Angel Stadium || 15,594 || 64–83 || L1
|- style="background:#bfb;" 
| 148 || September 20 || @ Rangers || 5–2 || Sandoval (6–9) || Santana (3–8) || Herget (6) || Globe Life Field || 19,472 || 65–83 || W1
|- style="background:#fbb;" 
| 149 || September 21 || @ Rangers || 2–7 || Dunning (4–8) || Davidson (2–7) || — || Globe Life Field || 20,959 || 65–84 || L1
|- style="background:#fbb;" 
| 150 || September 22 || @ Rangers || 3–5 || Moore (5–2) || Quijada (0–5) || Leclerc (7) || Globe Life Field || 16,223 || 65–85 || L2
|- style="background:#bfb;" 
| 151 || September 23 || @ Twins || 4–2 || Ohtani (14–8) || Varland (0–2) || Tepera (4) || Target Field || 24,896 || 66–85 || W1
|- style="background:#fbb;"
| 152 || September 24 || @ Twins || 4–8 || Jax (7–3) || Detmers (6–6) || — || Target Field || 30,959 || 66–86 || L1
|- style="background:#bfb;" 
| 153 || September 25 || @ Twins || 10–3 || Suárez (7–8) || Bundy (8–8) || — || Target Field || 24,133 || 67–86 || W1
|- style="background:#bfb;" 
| 154 || September 27 || Athletics || 4–3 || Tepera (5–3) || Puk (3–3) || Herget (7) || Angel Stadium || 19,374 || 68–86 || W2
|- style="background:#bfb;"
| 155 || September 28 || Athletics || 4–1 || Lorenzen (8–6) || Martínez (4–6) || Herget (8) || Angel Stadium || 23,573 || 69–86 || W3
|- style="background:#bfb;"
| 156 || September 29 || Athletics || 4–2 || Ohtani (15–8) || Irvin (9–13) || Tepera (5) || Angel Stadium || 31,293 || 70–86 || W4
|- style="background:#bfb;"
| 157 || September 30 || Rangers || 4–1 || Detmers (7–6) || Otto (6–10) || Herget (9) || Angel Stadium || 32,939 || 71–86 || W5
|- 

|- style="background:#bfb;" 
| 158 || October 1 || Rangers || 3–2 || Suárez (8–8) || Hernández (2–3) || Tepera (6) || Angel Stadium || 32,472 || 72–86 || W6
|- style="background:#bfb;" 
| 159 || October 2 || Rangers || 8–3 || Barría (3–3) || Miller (1–2) || — || Angel Stadium || 26,041 || 73–86 || W7
|- style="background:#fbb;" 
| 160 || October 3 || @ Athletics || 4–5  || Acevedo (4–4) || Weiss (0–1) || — || Oakland Coliseum || 6,978 || 73–87 || L1
|- style="background:#fbb;" 
| 161 || October 4 || @ Athletics || 1–2  || Puk (4–3) || Tepera (5–4) || — || Oakland Coliseum || 8,189 || 73–88 || L2
|- style="background:#fbb;" 
| 162 || October 5 || @ Athletics || 2–3 || Waldichuk (2–2) || Ohtani' (15–9) || Snead (1) || Oakland Coliseum || 11,232 || 73–89 || L3
|-

|- style="text-align:center;"
| Legend:       = Win       = Loss       = PostponementBold = Angels team member

Roster

Farm system

All coaches and rosters can be found on each team's website.

See also
Los Angeles Angels
Angel Stadium

References

External links
Los Angeles Angels Official Site
2022 Los Angeles Angels season at Baseball Reference''

Los Angeles Angels seasons
Los Angeles Angels
Los Angeles Angels